Arna Sigríður Albertsdóttir (born 8 June 1990) is an Icelandic handcyclist. Formerly a multi-sport athlete, she took up handcycling after being paralyzed in a skiing accident in 2006. In 2015, she became the first Icelandic athlete to compete in the UCI World Championships and in 2021, she became the first Icelander to participate in handcycling at the Paralympics.

Biography

Early life
Arna was born and raised in Ísafjörður, Iceland. In her youth, she trained football, swimming and skiing. During the summer of 2006, she played for BÍ/Bolungarvík's senior football team in the second-tier 1. deild kvenna.

Skiing accident
On 30 December 2006, while in a skiing training camp in Geilo, Norway, Arna landed off the track and crashed into a tree, fracturing her spine and paralyzing her below the waist.

Handcycling
A few years after the accident she moved to Reykjavík and started training under the guidelines of trainer Fannar Karvel. Arna first competed in handcycling in the autumn of 2014. In 2015 she became the first cyclist to represent Iceland at the UCI Para-cycling Road World Championships. On 20 March 2016, she finished first in road race event at a European Handcycling Federation's competition in Abu Dhabi while coming in second in the time trial event.

In August and September 2021, she competed at the 2020 Summer Paralympics in Tokyo, Japan, becoming the first Icelander to compete in handcycling at the Paralympics. In the time trial event on 31 August, she finished 11th. In the road race event on 1 September, Arna finished 15th.

Photos

References

External links
 
 

1990 births
Living people
Arna Sigridur Albertsdottir
Arna Sigridur Albertsdottir
Cyclists at the 2020 Summer Paralympics
Arna Sigridur Albertsdottir
People with paraplegia
Women's association footballers not categorized by position
20th-century Icelandic women
21st-century Icelandic women